Cojocari is a Moldovan surname. Notable people with the surname include:

 Andrei Cojocari (born 1987), Moldovan footballer
 Serafim Cojocari (born 2001), Moldovan footballer
 Sergiu Cojocari (born 1988),  Moldovan footballer

Surnames of Moldovan origin